Vezneciler may refer to:

Vezneciler neighborhood, part of Fatih district in the European part of Istanbul
Vezneciler (Istanbul Metro), an Istanbul metro station 
Vezneciler Campus, Istanbul University's main campus adjacent to Beyazıt Square